The men's high jump event at the 2007 European Athletics U23 Championships was held in Debrecen, Hungary, at Gyulai István Atlétikai Stadion on 15 July.

Medalists

Results

Final
15 July

Participation
According to an unofficial count, 14 athletes from 13 countries participated in the event.

 (1)
 (1)
 (1)
 (1)
 (1)
 (1)
 (2)
 (1)
 (1)
 (1)
 (1)
 (1)
 (1)

References

High jump
High jump at the European Athletics U23 Championships